Seadrift is a city in Calhoun County, Texas, United States. The population was 1,364 at the 2010 census. It is a part of the Victoria, Texas Metropolitan Statistical Area.

Geography

Seadrift is located in southwestern Calhoun County at  (28.412896, –96.712244).

Climate

The climate in this area is characterized by hot, humid summers and generally mild to cool winters.  According to the Köppen Climate Classification system, Seadrift has a humid subtropical climate, abbreviated "Cfa" on climate maps.

Demographics

2020 Census data

As of the 2020 United States census, there were 995 people, 617 households, and 353 families residing in the city.

2000 Census data
At the census of 2000, there were 1,352 people, 488 households, and 347 families residing in the city. The population density was 1,083.1 people per square mile (417.6/km). There were 652 housing units at an average density of 522.3/sq mi (201.4/km). The racial makeup of the city was 77.74% White, 0.89% African American, 0.22% Native American, 10.21% Asian, 7.91% from other races, and 3.03% from two or more races. Hispanic or Latino of any race were 27.07% of the population.

There were 488 households, out of which 36.9% had children under the age of 18 living with them, 57.2% were married couples living together, 9.2% had a female householder with no husband present, and 28.7% were non-families. 25.8% of all households were made up of individuals, and 12.9% had someone living alone who was 65 years of age or older. The average household size was 2.77 and the average family size was 3.34.

In the city, the population was 32.8% under the age of 18, 6.9% from 18 to 24, 25.7% from 25 to 44, 21.2% from 45 to 64, and 13.5% who were 65 years of age or older. The median age was 34 years. For every 100 females, there were 96.5 males. For every 100 females age 18 and over, there were 95.7 males. The median income for a household in the city was $26,339, and the median income for a family was $31,010. Males had a median income of $29,531 versus $21,250 for females. The per capita income for the city was $11,481. About 20.6% of families and 25.1% of the population were below the poverty line, including 33.1% of those under age 18 and 11.7% of those age 65 or over.

Education
Seadrift residents are served by the Calhoun County Independent School District. Seadrift School serves residents from Pre-Kindergarten through 8th grade. Residents attend Calhoun High School in Port Lavaca for high school.

1979 incident
Seadrift is remembered for a killing that took place on August 3, 1979. Prior to this date there had been several negative racial incidents between local citizens and Vietnamese refugees. As the central area relied heavily on the commercial fishing industry for income, many native felt threatened by the increasing number of Vietnamese. On the night of August 3, 1979, a fight broke out between Billy Joe Aplin, 35-year-old crabber and Sau Van Nguyen, a Vietnamese crabber which ended with the fatal shooting of Aplin. Within hours of the shooting, several Vietnamese boats were burned and there was an attempted bombing of a crab plant that employed Vietnamese workers. Sau Van Nguyen and his brother Chinh Nguyen were tried for murder and acquitted on the grounds of self-defense. The incident inspired the creation of both the 1981 documentary Fire on the Water and the 1985 film Alamo Bay. In January 2019, Title 8 Productions, LLC premiered an independent documentary called, Seadrift, in Park City Utah. It continues to be screened throughout the United States. The documentary series "Reel South" examined the 1979 incident in the 2020 film "Seadrift".

References

External links
 
 Seadrift Chamber of Commerce
 Handbook of Texas Online article
Reel South documentary "Seadrift" https://www.reelsouth.org/documentaries/seadrift

Populated coastal places in Texas
Cities in Calhoun County, Texas
Cities in Texas
Victoria, Texas metropolitan area